Juo or JUO may refer to:
 Jūō, Ibaraki
 Jūō Station
 Jiba language
 Joint Urban Operations
 Junior under officer